Rajmohan Gandhi (born 7 August 1935) is an Indian biographer, historian, and research professor at the Center for South Asian and Middle Eastern Studies, University of Illinois at Urbana-Champaign, US. His paternal grandfather is Mahatma Gandhi, and his maternal grandfather is Chakravarthi Rajagopalachari. He is also a scholar in residence at the Indian Institute of Technology Gandhinagar.

Early life
Rajmohan Gandhi was born 7 August 1935 in New Delhi, to Devdas and Lakshmi Gandhi. His father was the managing editor of the Hindustan Times. Rajmohan Gandhi attended St. Stephen's College. His maternal grandfather was C. Rajagopalachari, second Governor General of India, after Lord Louis Mountbatten, who was one of the foremost associates of Mahatma Gandhi.

Career

Academic career and activism 
Associated from 1956 with Initiatives of Change (formerly known as Moral Re-Armament), Rajmohan Gandhi has been engaged for half a century in efforts for trust-building, reconciliation and democracy and in battles against corruption and inequalities.

In the 1960s and early 1970s, Gandhi played a leading role in establishing Asia Plateau, the conference centre of Initiatives of Change in Panchgani, in the mountains of western India. Asia Plateau has been recognized in the Indian subcontinent for its ecological contribution. During the 1975–1977 Emergency in India, he was active for democratic rights personally and through his weekly journal, Himmat, published in Bombay from 1964 to 1981.

His book, A Tale of Two Revolts: India 1857 & the American Civil War (New Delhi: Penguin India, December 2009), studies two 19th-century wars occurring in opposite parts of the world at almost the same time. His previous book, a biography of his grandfather Mahatma Gandhi, Mohandas: A True Story of a Man, His People and an Empire, received the Biennial Award from the Indian History Congress in 2007. It has since been published in several countries.

In 2002, Gandhi received the Sahitya Akademi Award for Rajaji: A Life, a Biography of Chakravarti Rajagopalachari (1878–1972), about his maternal grandfather and a leading figure in India's independence movement, who became the first Indian Governor General, 1948–1950.

His other works include Ghaffar Khan: Nonviolent Badshah of the Pakhtuns (Penguin 2004); Revenge & Reconciliation: Understanding South Asian History (Penguin, 1999); Patel: A Life, a Biography of Vallabhbhai Patel (1875–1950), Deputy Prime Minister of India, 1947-50 (Navajivan, Ahmedabad, 1990); and Eight Lives: A Study of the Hindu-Muslim Encounter (SUNY, 1987). One of his earlier books, The Good Boatman: A Portrait of Gandhi, was published in 2009 in a Chinese translation in Beijing. Most recently, Gandhi has published a book titled, Punjab (Aleph Book Company 2013), which is a historical account of undivided Punjab, from the death of Aurangzeb to the Partition.

Before teaching at the University of Illinois, he served as a research professor with the New Delhi think-tank, Centre for Policy Research. From 1985 to 1987, he edited the daily Indian Express in Madras (now Chennai). In 2004. he received the International Humanitarian Award (Human Rights) from the city of Champaign, Illinois, and in 1997, he was awarded an honorary doctorate of law from the University of Calgary, and an honorary doctorate of philosophy from Obirin University, Tokyo. He currently serves as a Jury Member for the Nuremberg International Human Rights Award and co-chair of the Centre for Dialogue & Reconciliation in Gurgaon. In 2019 he was a contributor to A New Divan: A Lyrical Dialogue Between East and West (Gingko Library).

Politics 
In 1989, Gandhi unsuccessfully contested the Lok Sabha election from Janata Dal against Rajiv Gandhi in Amethi. He served (1990–92) in the Rajya Sabha (the upper house of the Indian Parliament) and led the Indian delegation to the UN Human Rights Commission in Geneva in 1990. In the Indian Parliament he was the convener of the all-party joint committee of both houses addressing the condition of Scheduled Castes and Scheduled Tribes.

On 21 February 2014, he joined the Aam Aadmi Party. He contested the 2014 general election from the East Delhi constituency and lost.

Personal life
Rajmohan Gandhi is married to Usha. They have two children, Supriya and Devadatta.

Books
 Why Gandhi Still Matters: An Appraisal of the Mahatma’s Legacy
 Understanding the Founding Fathers: An Enquiry into the Indian Republic’s Beginnings
 Punjab: A History from Aurangzeb to Mountbatten
 A Tale of Two Revolts
 Mohandas: A True Story of a Man, His People and an Empire
 Ghaffar Khan: Nonviolent Badshah of the Pakhtuns
 Understanding the Muslim Mind
 Rajaji: A Life
 Revenge & Reconciliation: Understanding South Asian History
 The Good Boatman 
 Patel: A Life
 Eight Lives: A Study of the Hindu-Muslim Encounter
 Modern South India: A History from the 17th Century to Our Times

References

External links
 Rajmohan Gandhi's website
 Crossette, Barbara, "In an Impatient Pocket of Rural India, Gandhi Fights for His Political Future", Special to The New York Times Sunday, 29 October 1989
 Gandhi, Rajmohan, Biographical Essay on C. Rajagopalachari
 

1935 births
21st-century Indian politicians
Aam Aadmi Party candidates in the 2014 Indian general election
Aam Aadmi Party politicians
Delhi politicians
Janata Dal politicians
Living people
Rajmohan
Recipients of the Sahitya Akademi Award in English
St. Stephen's College, Delhi alumni
University of Illinois Urbana-Champaign faculty
20th-century Indian historians